The Fiji Mission to the European Union is responsible for Fiji's diplomatic relations with the European Union and with all member countries, except those with which Fiji maintains specific diplomatic relations, such as the United Kingdom.

The Mission, which was first established in July 1973, is based in Brussels, Belgium, and doubles as Fiji's Embassy to Belgium.  The Head of Mission to the European Union, currently [H.E Mr Deo Saran], also holds the title of Ambassador to Belgium. He is assisted by Counsellor (Mr Nidhendra Pratap SINGH , who is responsible for agriculture and trade) and First Secretary, Mr Mesake LEDUA.  In addition, there are three supporting staff.

The main focus of the Mission is to promote Fiji's trading interests and gain markets for Fiji's sugar through such agreements as the Lome Convention and the Cotonou Agreement.  It has also helped negotiate tariff concessions and preferential market quotas for the export of garments and canned tuna to European countries.

List of heads of mission
The following individuals have held office as Head of Mission to the European Union.

References

External links
 Official website of Fiji's Mission to the European Union / Embassy to Belgium

European Mission
Fiji–European Union relations
Diplomatic missions in Brussels
Diplomatic missions of Fiji